Eclipse is a Mexican telenovela produced by Silvia Pinal for Televisa in 1984.

Silvia Pinal and Joaquín Cordero star as the protagonists, while Eduardo Palomo and Ofelia Guilmáin star as the antagonists.

Cast 
Silvia Pinal as Magda
Joaquín Cordero as Emmanuel
Eduardo Palomo as Fernando
Ofelia Guilmáin as Virginia
Augusto Benedico as Mateo
Pilar Souza as Concepción
Sergio Klainer as Atilio Greco
Blanca Sánchez as Alicia
Fernando Larrañaga as Nestor
Eugenia Avendaño as Isabel
Fernando Balzaretti as Simon
Martha Roth as Amalia
Martha Verduzco as Carmen
Lourdes Munguía as Lourdes
Wolf Rubinsky as Diego
Rosita Salazar Arenas as Cecilia
Polly as Pilar
Marcelo Romo as Carlos
Jorge Codiz as Daniel

References

External links 

1984 telenovelas
Mexican telenovelas
Televisa telenovelas
1984 Mexican television series debuts
1984 Mexican television series endings
Spanish-language telenovelas
Television shows set in Mexico